Copenhagen Zoo is a zoological garden in Copenhagen, Denmark. Founded in 1859, it is one of the oldest zoos in Europe and is a member of EAZA. It comprises  and is located in the municipality of Frederiksberg, sandwiched between the parks of Frederiksberg Gardens and Søndermarken. With 1,571,331 visitors in 2019 it is the most visited zoo and one of the most visited attractions in Denmark. The zoo is noted for its new Elephant House designed by British architect Sir Norman Foster. The zoo maintains and promotes a number of European breeding programmes.

History

Copenhagen Zoo was founded by the ornithologist Niels Kjærbølling in 1859. He was given the summer garden of "Prinsess Vilhelmines Have" (The garden of Princess Vilhelmine) by the chief directorate of Copenhagen. The animals that the visitors could contemplate at the opening were eagles, chickens, ducks, owls, rabbits, a fox, a seal in a bathtub and a turtle in a bucket. In the early years the zoo focused on showing as many different types of animals as possible, but as animal welfare later became an issue, the number of different species has dropped in favour of more space to each animal. In 1901 the zoo had a human display with 25 Indians- men, women and children- in an exhibition where the "brown exotic" people went about their daily lives in palm tree leaf huts constructed in the middle of the zoo.
One of the most notable animals kept there was a male slow worm that lived there from 1892 to 1946 (for 54 years, which is a record among lizards).

Starting in the early 1980s, Copenhagen Zoo has been undergoing a renovations aimed at replacing cages with enclosures which recreate animals' natural environments, giving a better lifestyle to the animals, and a more realistic experience to visitors. The Elephant House and  Savanna are results of these efforts. The Savanna includes a Hippopotamus House where the hippos can be watched underwater.

The zoo has preserved many of its historical buildings. The oldest building still in use, a stable for yaks, was erected in 1872, and now houses the bactrian camels. A Herbivore House built in 1875 still houses herbivores, namely tapirs. An owl tower from 1885 is today left as a memorial commemorating how zoo animals were once kept.

A notable and highly visible feature of the zoo is the wooden observation tower.  high, it offers views of the surrounding parklands and city. The tower was built in 1905 and is one of the tallest observation towers built of wood in the world. Its base is similar to that of Eiffel Tower.

Exhibits
Animals exhibited at the zoo that are not housed in any of the main areas include bactrian camels, American flamingos, scarlet ibises, roseate spoonbills, Dalmatian pelicans, turkey vultures, Humboldt penguins, California sea lions, black-capped squirrel monkeys, chimpanzees and lions.

The Nordics and the Arctic Ring
In the part of the zoo called "The Nordics", visitors can see species such as harbour seals, snowy owls, reindeer, musk oxen, brown bears, arctic foxes and grey wolves. The "Arctic Ring", which opened in 2013, has an exhibit for polar bears (including a tunnel allowing underwater views) and an aviary for North Atlantic seabirds (alcids).

Asia
In the "Asia" section, visitors can see Oriental small-clawed otters, red pandas, Malayan tapirs, Amur leopards and tigers, Asian elephants, and other animals.

The new Elephant House, which opened in June 2008, is designed by Norman Foster in cooperation with the Danish landscape architect Stig L. Andersson. It houses Asian elephants, and contains two glass-domed enclosures. One is for cows and calves and measures . The building also contain an exhibit space and a small lecture hall.

Africa
Most of the "Africa" section is taken up by the "Savanna" area. This is an open field with a visitor bridge above containing species such as white rhinoceroses, giraffes, impalas, sable antelopes, ostriches and plains zebras. The hippopotamuses, which have their own separate enclosure, also has partial access to the Savanna. Other species in the Africa section are okapis, Abyssinian ground hornbills, Congo peafowl, caracals and meerkats.

Tasmania
The "Tasmania" section is unique to Copenhagen Zoo. The section was started after the wedding of Frederik, the Crown Prince of Denmark and the Tasmanian native Mary Donaldson in 2004, where the Tasmanian government gifted four Tasmanian Devils to the zoo. These were the first Tasmanian devils to live outside of Australia. The area has since been expanded with a combined area for red-necked wallabies, Eastern Grey Kangaroos and common wombats. Parts of this area is also accessible by visitors, allowing kangaroos and people to cross paths.

South America
In the "South America" section, visitors can see species such as capybaras, guanacos, greater rheas, Patagonian maras, southern screamers and giant anteaters. They all have access to one common area, modeled after the South American pampas.

Tropical Zoo
The "Tropical Zoo" consists of a rainforest hall with one section for free-ranging birds, turtles and two-toed sloths and another for tropical butterflies and West African crocodiles. In between the two is a section for reptiles, amphibians, fish and the rare Java mouse-deer.

Children's Zoo
In the Children's Zoo, visitors can see farm animals and small domestic animals, such as llamas, goats, cows, pigs, horses, chickens and rabbits.

Rare species
 For several years, Copenhagen Zoo was the only zoo outside Australia that had Tasmanian devils, They bred for the first time in Copenhagen Zoo in 2013 and the two females gave birth to a total of seven young.
 Other rare species and subspecies kept in the zoo include: Schmitz's Caracals, Cape Weavers, Black-necked Weavers, East African Chimpanzee, Yellow-headed Amazon, Pink-tongued Skink, Tasmanian Wombat, Tasmanian Eastern Grey Kangaroo, Banded Razorbill and West African crocodile; all of which are rarely kept species in European zoos.
 Copenhagen Zoo has the rare Amur leopard, okapi, and muskox.
 In April 2019 Copenhagen Zoo received two giant panda on loan from China.

Culling controversy 

A healthy young male giraffe, Marius, was killed on 9 February 2014 on the recommendation of the European Association of Zoos and Aquaria. His meat was fed to the zoo's lions, while other parts were transferred to a scientific institution. The scientific director at Copenhagen Zoo, Bengt Holst defended the culling, saying that the giraffes at the zoo bred very well, and where this was the case, giraffes had to be killed to ensure the best genes were passed down to ensure the animals' long-term survival. He confirmed the zoo typically culls 20 to 30 animals every year.  The death occurred despite offers from other animal institutions (EAZA member Yorkshire Wildlife Park (YWP) in the United Kingdom and Hoenderdael Park in The Netherlands) to take the giraffe.

YWP released a statement that it had the capacity to accept a further giraffe into its bachelor herd in its state-of-the-art giraffe house built in 2012, and that contact had been made with Copenhagen Zoo but no reply had been received. YWP has previously received a male giraffe of the same age as Marius from Copenhagen Zoo.  Bengt Holst stated that the capacity at YWP would be better utilised by a giraffe whose genes were less represented amongst EAZA zoos.

The action was criticized by Stine Jensen from Denmark's Organisation Against the Suffering of Animals, who repudiated the action as unethical. She said, "This situation should not have occurred at all. It just shows that the zoo is in fact not the ethical institution that it wants to portray itself as being, because here you have a waste product - that being Marius. Here we have a zoo which thinks that putting this giraffe down instead of thinking of alternatives is the best option".

Images of the carcass being cut up in front of children and then fed to the zoo's lion population were circulated by the Associated Press. The zoo spokesperson, Tobias Stenbaek Bro, has been quoted as saying that visitors, including children, were invited to watch as the giraffe was skinned and parts fed to the lions. "I'm actually proud because I think we have given children a huge understanding of the anatomy of a giraffe that they wouldn't have had from watching a giraffe in a photo," Stenbaek Bro said in a telephone interview with the Associated Press.

On 25 March 2014, despite the backlash from the giraffe cull, the zoo euthanized four lions (two adults and two ten-month-old cubs). The zoo stated that they were introducing a male lion and did not want to disrupt the pride's natural structure and behaviour. The lions were not culled or dissected in public.

Cultural references
Copenhagen Zoo is used as location in the films Københavnere (1933), Wienerbarnet (1941), Hold fingrene fra mor (1951), Far til fire på landet (1955), Vi er allesammen tossede (1959), Rikki og mændene (1962), Den store badedag (1991), Jungledyret Hugo (1993), and Far til fire på japansk (2010).

The zoo is also used as location in episode 84 of the DR television show Huset på Christianshavn and in the TV2 television Christmas calendar Brødrenes Mortensens jul.

Exhibit gallery

References

External links

1859 establishments in Denmark
Zoos in Denmark
Zoo
Zoo Tower